Common names: red diamond rattlesnake, red rattlesnake, red diamond snake, more

Crotalus ruber is a venomous pit viper species found in southwestern California in the United States and Baja California in Mexico. Three subspecies are currently recognized, including the nominate subspecies described here.

Description
 
This moderately large species commonly exceeds  on the mainland. The largest specimen on record measured  (Klauber, 1937).

Crotalus ruber is very similar in pattern to C. atrox, but it is distinguished by its reddish color, to which the specific name, ruber, refers. Also, the first lower labial scale on each side is transversely divided to form a pair of anterior chin shields.

The dorsal scales are usually arranged in 29 rows, but may vary from 25 to 31 rows. Ventrals range from 185 to 206.

Snakes found in coastal regions are longer on average than those found in desert regions.

Common names
Common names include: red diamond rattlesnake, red rattlesnake, red diamond snake, red diamond-backed rattlesnake, red rattler, and western diamond rattlesnake. The form found on Cedros Island, previously described as C. exsul, was referred to as the Cedros Island diamond rattlesnake, or Cedros Island rattlesnake.

Geographic range
Red diamond rattlesnakes are found in the United States in southwestern California and southward through the Baja California peninsula, although not in the desert east of the Sierra de Juárez in northeastern Baja California. It also inhabits a number of islands in the Gulf of California, including Angel de la Guarda, Pond, San Lorenzo del Sur, San Marcos, Danzante, Monserrate and San José. Off the west coast of Baja California, it is found on Isla de Santa Margarita, which is off Baja California Sur, and (as C. exsul) on Isla de Cedros.

Originally, no type locality was given, although two have been proposed: "Dulzura, San Diego County, California", by Smith and Taylor (1950), and "vicinity of San Diego, California" by Schmidt (1953).

Conservation status
This species is classified as Least Concern on the IUCN Red List of Threatened Species (v3.1, 2001). Species are listed as such due to their wide distribution, presumed large population, or because they are unlikely to be declining fast enough to qualify for listing in a more threatened category. The population trend was down when assessed in 2007.

Habitat
C. ruber inhabits the cooler coastal zone, over the mountains, and into the desert beyond. It prefers the dense chaparral country of the foothills, cactus patches, and boulders covered with brush, from sea level to 1,500 m  in altitude.

Diet
This species preys on rabbits, ground squirrels, birds,  lizards, and other snakes.
Snakes from coastal populations consume prey of larger body mass than snakes from desert populations.

Reproduction
Mating occurs between February and April. Females give birth in August, to between three and 20 young. Neonates are 30 to 34 cm in length.

Venom

This species is of a mild disposition and has one of the least potent rattlesnake venoms. Nonetheless, a bite from this species is still a medical emergency and can be fatal without prompt antivenom treatment.

Brown (1973) lists an average venom yield of 364 mg (dried) and  values of 4.0, 3.7 mg/kg IV, 6.0, 7.0, 6.7 mg/kg IP and 21.2 mg/kg SC for toxicity.

However, Norris (2004) warned this species has a relatively large venom yield containing high levels of proteolytic enzymes, especially in the adults. A publication he mentions by Rael et al. (1986) showed it contains at least three proteolytic hemorrhagins that degrade fibrinogen and cause myonecrosis, but no Mojave toxin. On the other hand, three specimens from Mexico studied by Glen et al. (1983) did have Mojave toxin and lacked hemorrhagic activity.

Bite symptoms include massive tissue swelling, pain, ecchymosis, hemorrhagic blebs, and necrosis. Systemic symptoms may include nausea, vomiting, coagulopathy, clinical bleeding and hemolysis.

Subspecies

Taxonomy
Not enough genetic and morphological diversity exists between C. exsul from Cedros Island and C. ruber from the mainland to warrant the recognition of both species. Since C. exsul Garman (1884) has priority over C. ruber Cope (1892), they suggested the island population be referred to as C. e. exsul and those from the mainland as C. e. ruber. In response, Smith et al. (1998) petitioned the ICZN to validate ruber over exsul in the interest of nomenclatural stability. In 2000, the ICZN published Opinion 1960 in which they ruled C. ruber should have precedence over C. exsul.

References

Further reading

 Cope ED. 1892. A critical review of the characters and variations of the snakes of North America. Proceedings of the U.S. National Museum 14(882): 589-694.
 Garman S. 1884. The reptiles and batrachians of North America. Memoires of the Museum of Comparative Zoology 8(3): 1-185.
 Murphy RW, Kovac V, Haddrath O, Oliver GS, Fishbein A. 1995. MtDNA gene sequence, allozyme, and morphological uniformity among red diamond rattlesnakes, Crotalus ruber and Crotalus exsul. Canadian Journal of Zoology 73(2): 270-281.
 Smith HM, Brown LE, Chiszar D, Grismer LL, Allen GS, Fishbein A, Hollingsworth BD, McGuire JA, Wallach V, Strimple P, Liner EA. 1998. Crotalus ruber Cope, 1892 (Reptilia, Serpentes): proposed precedence of the specific name over that of Crotalus exsul Garman, 1884. Bulletin of Zoological Nomenclature 55(4): 229-232.

External links

 
 Crotalus exsul (=Crotalus ruber) Red Diamond Rattlesnake at San Diego Museum of Natural History. Accessed 7 February 2007.
 Crotalus exsul (=Crotalus ruber) Red Diamond Rattlesnake Field Observation at Laguna Beach, CA, Water Tank Road. Accessed 26 March 2022.

ruber
Reptiles of Mexico
Reptiles of the United States
Fauna of California
Natural history of Baja California
Natural history of Baja California Sur
Fauna of the California chaparral and woodlands
Fauna of the Colorado Desert
Fauna of the Mojave Desert
Fauna of Gulf of California islands
Cedros Island
Natural history of San Diego County, California
Reptiles described in 1892